Treeton is a civil parish in the Metropolitan Borough of Rotherham, South Yorkshire, England.  The parish contains seven listed buildings that are recorded in the National Heritage List for England.  Of these, one is listed at Grade I, the highest of the three grades, and the others are at Grade II, the lowest grade.  The parish contains the village of Treeton and the surrounding countryside.  The listed buildings consist of houses and cottages, farmhouses and farm buildings, a church, its former rectory, and a set of stocks.


Key

Buildings

References

Citations

Sources

 

Lists of listed buildings in South Yorkshire
Buildings and structures in the Metropolitan Borough of Rotherham